Dorcadion drusum is a species of beetle in the family Cerambycidae. It was described by Chevrolat in 1870. It is known from Syria and Lebanon.

References

drusum
Beetles described in 1870